Willy Böckl (27 January 1893 – 22 April 1975) was an Austrian figure skater. He won the World Figure Skating Championships four times and captured two silver medals at the Winter Olympics.

After retiring from skating, he moved to the United States and became a coach. In 1938, Willy Boeckl (the spelling was changed sometime after he arrived in the United States) was one of thirteen prominent figure skating instructors from the United States and Canada, who met in Lake Placid, New York for the purpose of forming an association of figure skating instructors. This distinguished group became known as the American Skaters Guild (the name was later changed to the Professional Skaters Guild of America in 1950, and again to the current name of the Professional Skaters Association). Willy became the first president of the guild; Willie Frick its first vice-president, and Walter Arian, second vice-president.

Results

References

Navigation 

Austrian male single skaters
Olympic figure skaters of Austria
Figure skaters at the 1924 Winter Olympics
Figure skaters at the 1928 Winter Olympics
Olympic silver medalists for Austria
Sportspeople from Klagenfurt
1893 births
1975 deaths
Olympic medalists in figure skating
World Figure Skating Championships medalists
European Figure Skating Championships medalists
Medalists at the 1924 Winter Olympics
Medalists at the 1928 Winter Olympics